Playgirl is an adult magazine.

Playgirl or Play Girl may also refer to:

Film and television
 The Play Girl, a 1928 American film directed by Arthur Rosson
 Play Girl (1932 film), an American film directed by Ray Enright
 Play Girl (1941 film), an American film directed by Frank Woodruff
 Playgirl (film), a 1954 American film directed by Joseph Pevney
 Playgirl (TV series), a 1969–1976 Japanese action/drama series

Music
 Playgirl (album), by Rina Aiuchi, 2004, also the first song on the album
 "Playgirl" (song), by Ladytron, 1999
 "Play Girl", a track on the album Girls, the 2019 debut album by Yung Baby Tate

See also
 Playgirlz, an album by After School, 2012
 Playboy (disambiguation)
 Playmates (disambiguation)